Oyesade "Sade" Olatoye (born 25 January 1997) is a Nigerian athlete competing in the shot put and hammer throw. She switched allegiance from the United States in 2019. She represented Nigeria in the shot put at the 2019 World Championships in Doha without reaching the final. Earlier that year, she won two medals at the 2019 African Games.

International competitions

Personal bests
Outdoor
Shot put – 17.88 (Austin 2019)
Discus throw – 51.65 (Iowa City 2019)
Hammer throw – 69.37 (Austin 2019)
Weight throw – 24.46 (Birmingham 2019)
Indoor
Shot put – 17.88 (Ann Arbor 2019)

References

1997 births
Living people
Nigerian female shot putters
Nigerian hammer throwers
American female shot putters
American female hammer throwers
World Athletics Championships athletes for Nigeria
Athletes (track and field) at the 2019 African Games
African Games medalists in athletics (track and field)
African Games gold medalists for Nigeria
African Games bronze medalists for Nigeria
Ohio State Buckeyes women's track and field athletes
African Games gold medalists in athletics (track and field)
20th-century Nigerian women
21st-century Nigerian women
African Championships in Athletics winners